Senator Harman may refer to:

Arthur C. Harman (1854–1927), Virginia State Senate
Tom Harman (born 1941), Ohio State Senate

See also
Don Harmon (born 1966), Illinois State Senate